Lucky Bucky in Oz (1942) is the thirty-sixth in the series of Oz books created by L. Frank Baum and his successors, and the third and last written and illustrated solely by John R. Neill. (He wrote a fourth, The Runaway in Oz, but died before illustrating it.)

Bucky Jones is aboard a tugboat in New York Harbor when the boiler blows up. He is soon blown into the Nonestic Ocean where he meets Davy Jones, a wooden whale. The pair take an undersea route to the Emerald City, and have many adventures along the way.

References

Oz (franchise) books
1942 American novels
1942 fantasy novels
1942 children's books